Agona East is one of the constituencies represented in the Parliament of Ghana. It elects one Member of Parliament (MP) by the first past the post system of election. Agona East is located in the Agona East district of the Central Region of Ghana.

Boundaries
The seat is located entirely within the Agona East district of the Central Region of Ghana.

Members of Parliament

Elections

See also
List of Ghana Parliament constituencies

References 

Parliamentary constituencies in the Central Region (Ghana)